Danger Signal is a 1945 film noir starring Faye Emerson and Zachary Scott. The screenplay was adapted from the 1939 novel of the same name by Phyllis Bottome.

Plot
A mysterious pulp writer—and psychopath—named Ronnie Mason, steals a dead woman's wedding ring and money and leaves a fake suicide note. The woman's husband, Thomas Turner, when questioned by the local police, believes his dead wife might have been seeing Mason behind his back. He also believes his wife was murdered, but in the absence of other evidence, the police list it as a suicide and drop the case.

Mason leaves town, changes his name to Marsh and, displaying a noticeable limp he acquired jumping from the dead woman's bedroom window and a veteran's pin he steals from a fellow passenger on the L.A. bus, passes himself off as a wounded veteran and rents a room in a house Mrs. Fenchurch shares with her elder daughter Hilda, a public stenographer, and the teenaged Anne. All three women are extremely impressionable, and to the consternation of professor Andrew Lang, who secretly loves Hilda, the girls fall for Marsh's charms.

Hilda and Marsh get involved, even spend a weekend retreat together - financed by the earnest, thrifty Hilda. Marsh claims to be broke, awaiting his first sale, but conceals it when the MacLellen Publishing Company sends him $200 for his short story "Dark Island," to be published in the next issue of Adventure Tales magazine.

Hilda sees visions of marriage straight ahead. When Marsh learns that Anne might inherit a great deal of money, he drops Hilda cold and secretly takes up with Anne. Eventually the truth comes out about them. Hilda is both jealous and suspicious, enough so that she plots to lure Marsh to a beach house and poison him. She is unable to go through with it, but when Marsh runs off, he is surprised by Turner, who has tracked him down, and plunges off a steep cliff to his death.

Cast
 Faye Emerson as Hilda Fenchurch
 Zachary Scott as Ronnie Mason / Marsh
 Richard Erdman as Bunkie Taylor (as Dick Erdman)
 Rosemary DeCamp as Dr. Jane Silla
 Bruce Bennett as Dr. Andrew Lang
 Mona Freeman as Anne Fenchurch
 John Ridgely as Thomas Turner
 Mary Servoss as Mrs. Fenchurch
 Joyce Compton as Kate
 Virginia Sale as Mrs. Crockett

Reception
Bosley Crowther, the film critic for The New York Times, panned the film, describing it a "diluted little melodrama" in which the filmmakers resort to a car chase in order to relieve boredom. The ending proved to be a disappointment. In the Bottome novel, Hilda does indeed poison Marsh. Warner Bros., however, thought it improper for Faye Emerson, the daughter-in-law of President Franklin D. Roosevelt by her marriage to Elliott Roosevelt, to portray a murderess.

Box office
According to financial records at Warner Bros., the film was a box-office success, earning $689,000 domestically and $421,000 internationally.

References

External links
 
 
 
 
 

1945 films
1945 crime films
American crime films
1940s English-language films
American black-and-white films
Film noir
Films scored by Adolph Deutsch
Films based on British novels
Films directed by Robert Florey
Warner Bros. films
1940s American films